M/Y A+, previously named Topaz, is a luxury motor yacht constructed by Lürssen in Bremen, Germany.

History
Topaz was launched in May 2012.

Topaz was partially acquired with funds from the 1MDB investment fund, this embroiled the yacht in controversy as part of the 1Malaysia Development Berhad scandal.

Design
The yacht's interior was designed by Terence Disdale Design and the exterior designed by Tim Heywood.

Description
Topaz was built in the same German shipyard as the Azzam, the world's largest private yacht.

The vessel features a steel displacement hull, an aluminium superstructure and consists of eight decks. This yacht was originally being built in a  dry dock but to complete the project, the yacht had to be taken to a  dock to be built alongside. When launched in 2012, Topaz was the world's fourth-largest luxury yacht.

Engineering
The main engines are twin Pielstick diesel engines, each with power of 7990 hp. This is enough power for the yacht to reach a service speed of 22.9 knots, while the maximum speed is over 25.5 knots. The yacht is also equipped with two diesel generators and an emergency diesel generator. These aggregates provide power to the stabilisers, navigation equipment and all the facilities on board.

Interior
A+ is equipped with zero-speed stabilisers, Jacuzzi (on deck), double helicopter landing pads, swimming pool, tender garage, swimming platform, air conditioning, underwater lights. There is also a fitness hall, cinema and a large conference room.

See also
 List of motor yachts by length
 Tranquility (yacht)

References

External links

2012 ships
Motor yachts